The Francevillian B Formation, also known as the Francevillian Formation or FB2 in scientific research, is a geologic formation of black shale provinces close to the town of Franceville, Gabon from where it gets its name from. The formation was deposited between 2.14-2.08 Ga (billion years ago) in the Palaeoproterozoic, and, uniquely, has not experienced any thermal overprinting due to diagenesis after burial nor significant metamorphism since it was deposited unlike other formations deposited around the same time. The Francevillian B Formation is important to the field of palaeontology because it contains fossil material of possible eukaryotic organisms from around 2.1 Ga which have been informally dubbed the "Francevillian biota" or "Gabonionta". This biota takes on the appearance of a multitude of forms such as discs with ruffled ridges, ruffled blobs, "stalked/tailed flowers" and strings of beads that were interpreted by Abderrazak El Albani as being akin to that of Dictyostelium slime moulds. El Albani also described a multitude of "strings of beads" which appear to have been similar to those found on the "stalked flowers" that he described along with the other biota which have been compared to the far younger Beltanelliformis. The fossils of the biota from the Francevillian B formation are assumed to have had primitive cell-to-cell communication, as they are older than the oldest known evidence for the existence of multicellularity in the fossil record

Significance and History 
The Francevillian B. Formation was discovered by a team of palaeontologists led by the French-Moroccan palaeontologist Abderrazak El Albani in 2010 with assistance from the University of Poitiers. The team revolutionized ideas about the earliest life on Earth, because the earliest known geochemical evidence dates back as far as 3.7 Ga, and discovered a biota made of macroscopic multicellular organisms which were dated to be around 2.1 billion years old that were informally named the "Francevillian biota". However, these fossils had multiple interpretations and were at one time thought of as being microbial mats similar to those found in the Ediacaran. A combination of scanning electron microscopy, petrographic analyses, Raman spectroscopy and analyses of the elements of the carbon-rich laminae and microtexure from the fossils concluded that the biota of the Francevillian B Formation were of organic origin. The Franceville basin also has another basin near it, the Lastourville basin.

Geology 
The Francevillian Formation has recently been discovered to contain traces of uranium. The Francevillian basin itself already contained Oklo Mine, a natural nuclear reactor. However, the formation also witnessed a former system of petroleum which showed major amounts of uranium associated with organic matter. Several episodes of oil generation, migration and fluid mixing along with hydrofracturing are the cause of the uranium mineralization. During burial of the formation, its multiple black shales were heated and in doing so expelled hydrocarbons that migrated into underlying sandstones, with the first episode of the oil migration being synchronous along with a silicification event that derived into a hot and low salinity fluid which is proven by fluid inclusions trapped in overgrowths of quartz. However, the second episode of the oil migration was contemporaneous and has quartz dissolution with the episode being characterized by the mixing of hydrocarbons and oxidizing the uranium-bearing brine which in turn caused the precipitation of UO2 to be included in the oils. In the third and final episode of oil migration within the Francevillian B formation, oil-to-gas conversion generated overly-pressured gas trapped with uraniferous bitumen nodules in pores. Changes in the stress regime probably favoured radial hydrofracturing around the bitumen nodules as well as the subsequent development of a somewhat pervasive micro-fracture network.

Biota 

The Francevillian B formation is most notable for its significant fossil findings of the informally dubbed "Francevillian biota". These centimetre-sized discs include a wide variety of shapes, which include elongate, lobate and rod-shaped "strings of beads" that are often associated with one another and are ubiquitous to the formation. With the combination of Microtomography, Geochemistry and analysing sediments has revealed that this biota fossilized in the early stages of diagenesis. A rise in Oxygen levels followed up with the emergence of this biota and is further evidence to support the idea of surface Oxygenation being able to evolutionary and ecology expansion of complex macro and megascopic life, with there also being the inclusion of organic-walled Acritarchs. The reports of these centimetre-sized pyritized fossils from Gabon have opened a new window on the vision of the fossil record and also shows new evidence for the existence of some of the oldest known multi-cellular organisms in the fossil record. Grypania spiralis may have also been a Eukaryote from about 2 Billion years ago. Grypania and Horodyskia (although the latter is much younger than the former and younger than the Francevillian Biota) are also from a similar timeframe (similar as in appeared in a timeframe which is similar to the timeframe in which the Francevillian biota appeared) as the Francevillian biota, with Grypania being from around 2.0-2.1 GA and Horodyskia being
dated to about 1.5-0.9 GA. The somewhat similarly aged,  in length, urn-shaped fossils of Diskagma buttonii were evidence for the earliest life on land and have been dated to around 2200 MA.

The Francevillian biota are, in part with some geochemical traces of organic matter from Western Greenland, part of the earth's earliest probable life forms and provided crucial steps in the evolution of Eukaryotes. However, the biota seen in the Francevillian Formation sparked some debating on their full taxonomic affinity, as well as the evolution and origin of organisms and modern-day Phyla. The interpretation of this biota as being colonies of Archaea (like Grypania and Horodyskia) has not been accepted because of their complex morphology that is much more complex than Grypania. The up-to  450 specimens can almost be attributed to the same body plan, however some are reminiscent of Flatworms. Although the fossils are share unique characteristics and often can be mistaken with each other, it's currently unknown if they represent the life stages of one organism in particular, or if they represent several individual species and taxa. The fossils all have a common central spherical element present in all of them which would often be flexible and exhibits a tiny amount of folds. Although it's most commonly distorted and folded in fossils.

See also 

 Francevillian Biota
 Franceville basin
 Burgess Shale
 Oklo Mine

References

External links 
 For more images of the Francevillian biota, see  Experiment Life – the Gabonionta (English version).

Geology of Gabon
Shale formations
Fossils of Gabon
Gabon
Paleontological sites
Oil shale formations
Geography of Gabon
Precambrian fossils
Life
Prehistoric Africa by country
Precambrian Africa